Pavón is a district of the Golfito canton, in the Puntarenas province of Costa Rica.  The town, also known as Pavones, is located near the mouth of the Golfo Dulce.

History 
Pavón was created on 13 January 1993 by Decreto Ejecutivo 21936-G.

Geography 
Pavón has an area of  km² and an elevation of  metres.

Demographics 

For the 2011 census, Pavón had a population of  inhabitants.

Transportation

Road transportation 
The district is covered by the following road routes:
 National Route 611

Economy 
It is around 15 km south of Playa Zancudo. The town is renowned as a surfer's haven with some of the best waves in the world. Sport fishing, hiking, bird watching, wildlife observation and yoga are also popular.

References 

Districts of Puntarenas Province
Populated places in Puntarenas Province